This is a list of Scottish football transfers featuring at least one 2015–16 Scottish Premiership club or one 2015–16 Scottish Championship club which were completed during the summer 2015 transfer window. The window closed at midnight on 1 September 2015.

List

See also
 List of Scottish football transfers winter 2014–15
 List of Scottish football transfers winter 2015–16

External links
Scottish Premiership ins and outs - Summer 2015, BBC Sport
Scottish Championship ins and outs - Summer 2015, BBC Sport

References

Transfers
Scottish
2015 in Scottish sport
2015 summer